Hatiara is a locality in Bidhannagar Municipal Corporation of North 24 Parganas district in the Indian state of West Bengal. It is close to Kolkata and also a part of the area covered by Kolkata Metropolitan Development Authority (KMDA).

Transport
Buses ply along the Hatiara Road, which is the artery of the locality. Private Bus routes 30C/2 connect Hatiara to saltlake sec 5 and 30C & 30C/1 connect Hatiara with Babughat. The bus terminus is 4.3 km away from Eco Park Gate 1.

Drainage 
The area around 30C bus stand and Hatiara New Market is highly populated but has no proper drainage system.

References

Cities and towns in North 24 Parganas district
Neighbourhoods in North 24 Parganas district
Neighbourhoods in Kolkata
Kolkata Metropolitan Area